Jolene Chin Yeng-Mun or  Chan Ying Man, or Chen Ying Wen (Traditional Chinese: 陳影雯), is a beauty pageant queen from Kuala Lumpur, Malaysia. She won the title of Miss Astro Chinese International in 2004 where she received the Miss Friendship Award and Miss Elegance Award and, represented Malaysia at the Miss Chinese International Pageant. She also won the Miss Chinese International Friendship Award in 2005. She can speak English, Cantonese, Mandarin, and Malay.

Education 
Jolene studied at a Chinese primary school but went to Australia to further her studies. It was at Perth where she studied finance and marketing and graduated with a bachelor's degree in Commerce, Finance & Marketing. She was also formerly a marketing executive.

Career 
In an interview with Mobile World Magazine about what she was doing after she won the Miss Astro Chinese International Pageant, she stated that she was doing some fashion shoots, catwalk modelling and acting in short dramas for TV. Jolene also said that she was working on a project about child abuse, and training as a counsellor to help abused children. At the time, she was the PR director for Kiwanis Sri Hartamas, as well. When questioned about what career track she wanted to follow, Jolene replied: "For the moment, I’m going to continue doing hosting and emceeing work. I’d like to learn more about PR and advertising. Eventually work towards setting up my own business someday…".

Awards 
 2004: Miss Astro Chinese International - also Miss Friendship and Miss Elegance
 2005: Miss Friendship (Miss Chinese International)

References 

Living people
Malaysian people of Chinese descent
1980 births
Malaysian beauty pageant winners
People from Kuala Lumpur